WNI or wni may refer to:

 WNI, the IATA code for Matahora Airport, Southeast Sulawesi, Indonesia
 wni, the ISO 639-3 code for Ndzwani dialect, Comoros and Mayotte
 Warga Negara Indonesia, the Indonesian term for an Indonesian citizen